The London Art Fair (LAF) is an annual contemporary art fair held at the Business Design Centre in Islington, London.

Overview
The fair displays modern British and contemporary art, from the early 20th century onwards, presented by galleries and private collectors. Alongside over 125 participating galleries in the main fair, there are two curated sections focusing on younger galleries and new work with art projects and contemporary photography with Photo50.

The 2019 fair was held during 16–20 January 2019. After a gap, the 34th fair was held during 20–24 April 2022, postponed from January due to the COVID-19 pandemic. In 2023, the fair returned to its normal timing, 18–22 January 2023.

The London Art Fair is one of a number of art fairs in London.

See also
 British Art Fair
 London Art Week

Gallery

References

External links

 
 

Recurring events with year of establishment missing
Contemporary art fairs
Art fairs
Arts in London
Annual events in London
January events
British art
Islington